HMS Buzzard was a Nymphe-class composite screw sloop and the fourth ship of the Royal Navy to bear the name.

Design
Developed and constructed for the Royal Navy on a design by William Henry White, Director of Naval Construction, she was launched at Sheerness Dockyard on 10 May 1887.

Foreign service
The Nymphe-class sloops were ideal for service in the far distant outposts of the British Empire, and Buzzard was employed on the North America and West Indies Station. In early April 1902, under the command of Commander Leicester Francis Gartside Tippinge (1855–1938), she left Bermuda for home waters, calling at Faial Island, before she arrived at Devonport on 20 April. She was paid off at Chatham on 13 May 1902.

Harbour training ship
In 1904 she was converted to a drill ship for the Royal Naval Volunteer Reserve at Blackfriars, London, and in 1911 Buzzard relieved HMS President (formerly  of 1878) as headquarters ship, being renamed HMS President on 1 April 1911.

Disposal

As President she served until 23 January 1918, when she was lent to the Marine Society.  She was sold to C A Beard for breaking on 6 September 1921, and was later re-sold to Dutch ship breakers.

References 

Battleships-cruisers.co.uk: Royal Navy Sloops
Port Cities: London

 

Nymphe-class sloops
Ships built in Sheerness
1887 ships
Victorian-era sloops of the United Kingdom
Royal Navy shore establishments